EJOT is a medium-sized group of companies with markets including the construction, automotive and consumer electronics industries. The group headquarters are in Bad Berleburg in the Siegen-Wittgenstein region in Germany.

History 

The origin of EJOT is the former Adolf Böhl GmbH & Co. KG, a manufacturer of screws and nails founded in 1922 in Bad Berleburg - Berghausen.

In 1960, after the death of the founder, his nephew Hans W. Kocherscheidt inherited the company. In 1965 he bought the screw producing company Eberhard Jaeger in Bad Laasphe and merged the two companies under the name EJOT.

In 1971 an Engineered Plastic Components production was added to the production in Bad Berleburg. In 1993 EJOT acquired the former Volkseigener Betrieb, Schraubenwerk Tambach GmbH in Tambach-Dietharz, Thuringia. With time, expansion, acquisitions and diversification developed the former screws company into the present business group with approx. 2200 employees. About 1500 employees are working in Germany, further 700 employees belong to foreign offices and connected companies in Europe, Russia, United Arab Emirates, China, Mexico and the United States.

In Mexico, the company produces cold-formed fasteners for various customers in the automotive industry, the electronics industry, household appliances and construction. EJOTATF Fasteners de México is a joint venture between two companies in the industry:

EJOT GmbH & Co. KG, Germany 
ATF Inc., Lincolnwood IL, USA

The plant at the Parque Industrial Millennium in San Luis Potosí augments the San Luis Potosí Assembly, a General Motors assembly plant, among other customers.

Companies based in North Rhine-Westphalia
1922 establishments in Germany
Manufacturing companies established in 1922
Siegen-Wittgenstein